= 2021 Winnebago County, Wisconsin Executive election =

- April 6, 2021

Nominee	Jon Doemel	Mark Harris
Party	Nonpartisan	Nonpartisan
Popular vote	13,062	11,171
Percentage	53.83%	46.03%
County Executive before election
Mark Harris
Nonpartisan
Elected County Executive
Jon Doemel
Nonpartisan

The 2021 Winnebago County, Wisconsin Executive election took place on April 6, 2021. Incumbent County Executive Mark Harris ran for re-election to a fifth term. He was challenged by businessman Jon Doemel, the former Chairman of the Oshkosh Chamber of Commerce. Doemel campaigned as an "independent" and focused on the need for a strong relationship between county government and local businesses, while Harris campaigned on his record as County Executive.

Doemel ultimately defeated Harris, winning 54 percent of the vote to Harris's 46 percent.

== General election ==
=== Candidates ===
- Jon Doemel, businessman, former Chairman of the Oshkosh Chamber of Commerce
- Mark Harris, incumbent County Executive

=== Results ===
2021 Winnebago County Executive election
Party	Candidate	Votes	%
Nonpartisan	Jon Doemel	13,062	53.83%
Nonpartisan	Mark Harris (inc.)	11,171	46.03%
Write-in		34	0.14%
Total votes		24,267	100.00%
